Daniel Rodríguez Crespo (born 9 August 2005), known as Dani Rodríguez, is a Spanish professional footballer currently playing as a midfielder for Barcelona.

Club career
Born in Astigarraga, Rodríguez started his career with Real Sociedad. In March 2020, fellow La Liga side Barcelona put in a bid for the young midfielder, and he joined in April of the same year. He had previously been linked with a move to French side Paris Saint-Germain.

International career
Rodríguez has represented Spain at youth international level. After recovering from a sprain in his knee ligament, he went on to star at the 2022 UEFA European Under-17 Championship for Spain.

References

2005 births
Living people
Spanish footballers
Spain youth international footballers
Association football midfielders
Real Sociedad footballers
FC Barcelona players